Rhodri Jones (born 23 December 1991) is a Wales international rugby union player.  Jones was born in Aberystwyth, and is a Welsh-speaker. He currently plays for the Dragons RFC, having previously played for Ospreys, Scarlets and Llanelli. His position is loosehead prop.

He has had 15 appearances for Llaneli and 100 for the Welsh region side the Scarlets.

Jones has also represented the Wales U20 national side.

In November 2011 Jones was named in the senior Wales training squad for the match versus Australia on 3 December 2011. He made his debut for Wales against the Barbarians on 2 June 2012 at the Millennium Stadium.

At the end of the 2015–16 it was announced that Jones had signed for the Ospreys and he would link up with then at the end of the Wales tour to New Zealand.

Jones joined Dragons RFC in 2022.

References

External links
 
 Dragons RFC profile

1991 births
Living people
Rugby union players from Aberystwyth
Rugby union props
Scarlets players
Wales international rugby union players
Welsh rugby union players
Ospreys (rugby union) players
Dragons RFC players